The BMW Z4 (E89) is the second generation of the BMW Z4 range of two-door roadsters, and was produced from 2009 to 2016. The E89 replaced the E85/E86 Z4 and is the fourth model in the BMW Z Series.

The E89 Z4 was the first Z Series model to use a retractable hardtop roof, which meant 
that there were no longer separate roadster and coupé versions of the car. There was no Z4 M model for the E89 generation.

The Z4 (E89) was succeeded by the Z4 (G29) in 2018.

Development and launch 
The E89 was the first BMW automobile to be completely designed by two female designers — Juliane Blasi (exterior) and Nadya Arnaout (interior) — in 2006.

The Z4 (E89) was officially announced on 13 December 2008 and was unveiled at the 2009 North American International Auto Show in Detroit, alongside the MINI Convertible. The Z4 (E89) was then launched in markets in May 2009.

A total of €130 million was spent from 2007 to 2009 in expansion of the Regensburg plant for production of the Z4 (E89). Although its predecessor was produced in the Spartanburg plant in the United States, the E89 was produced in the BMW's Regensburg plant alongside the E93 3 Series convertible making it the third Z series car to be manufactured in Germany since the Z1 and Z8.

Design 

The E89 Z4 was offered with the base level sDrive or optional M Sport trim. The M Sport trim included 18-inch alloy wheels, leather upholstery, sports seats, redesigned front and rear bumpers, sports steering wheel and sports suspension. An optional Design Pure Impulse package was also offered, having colour matching Alcantara or Nappa leather, and BMW Individual anthracite roof lining.

The 2013 facelift also introduced the Design Pure Traction and Pure Fusion Design package, which had the choice of the exclusive Valencia Orange and Sparkling Brown metallic paintwork respectively (alongside regular colours), and colour matching interior design elements. The Design Pure Traction package also featured a black hardtop roof.

Equipment 
The E89 Z4 came standard with BMW EfficientDynamics technologies, such as regenerative braking and electric power steering. Models also feature an electric parking brake, engine start-stop system, directional headlights, and a driving mode selector with Comfort, Sport, and Sport+ modes which adjust throttle and gearbox behaviour, power steering weighting, and the adjustable dampers (with the optional 'Electronic Damper Control'). The models could also be ordered with the iDrive infotainment system with BMWConnected services and keyless entry.

Transmissions 
The available transmissions are:
 6-speed manual Getrag GS6-17BG (Z4 18i / 20i / 23i / 28i / 30i)
 6-speed manual Getrag GS6-53BZ (Z4 35i)
 6-speed automatic ZF 6HP19 (Z4 23i / 30i)
 8-speed automatic ZF 8HP45 (Z4 18i / 20i / 28i)
 7-speed dual-clutch Getrag GS7-D36SG (Z4 35i / 35is)

Models 

Since the summer of 2013, all Z4 models met Euro 6 (EU6) exhaust emission standards.

No diesel or all-wheel drive (xDrive) models were offered for the E89 Z4.

Z4 sDrive35is 
The Z4 sDrive35is is not available with a 6 speed manual. It was only available with a 7-speed dual-clutch transmission (DCT) in the M Sport trim, and uses an upgraded version of the N54 engine shared with the 1 Series M Coupé. The engine has a computer-controlled overboost function for 3rd to 7th gears. The boost function activates after each gear change with full throttle, and lasts for 7 seconds between 1,500 and 4,500rpm.

Concept cars

Zagato Coupé (2012) 

The Zagato Coupé was a concept car based on the Z4 (E89) developed in collaboration with Italian design house Zagato. It was unveiled at the Concorso d'Eleganza Villa d'Este on 25 May 2012. As the then BMW chief designer Adrian van Hooydonk and Zagato chief designer Norihiko Harada were friends, the decision was quickly made when Andrea Zagato proposed a collaboration with BMW. The body of the Zagato Coupé was built entirely by hand and includes a double-bubble roof and Rosso Vivace paint which changes colour depending on the lighting, ranging from a near black to a bright red. The Zagato Coupé also incorporates the letter "z" in its design, with the kidney grille composed of small matte "z" letters, with "z" letters embroidered into the seats.

Zagato Roadster (2012) 

The Zagato Roadster was the roadster version of the Zagato Coupé that was unveiled three months earlier, and was introduced at the Pebble Beach Concours d'Elegance on 19 August 2012. The Zagato Roadster was manufactured in six weeks, from the first design idea to the finished model. Similar to the Zagato Coupé, the paint work of the Roadster changes appearance according to the lighting, ranging from dark grey to a light silver. The roadster does away with the retractable hard-top of the Z4 and incorporated a tonneau cover for protection of the interior which incorporates a double-bubble shape. The Zagato roadster has a black interior, with a strip of brown leather trim extending to the roll-over hoops.

Model year changes

2011 
 The six-cylinder sDrive23i and sDrive30i models were replaced by turbocharged four-cylinder sDrive20i and sDrive28i models.

2012 

2013 facelift 
The Z4 facelift (also known as LCI) models were introduced in March 2013. Major changes were:
 Redesigned headlights (now using LED lamps) and side indicators.
 Interior changes including black surrounds for the central air vents, and revised higher quality switches, control panel and buttons.
 Introduction of the "Pure Balance Design" and "Pure Traction Design" option packages.

Safety 
The E89 Z4 comes with electronic stability control, cornering brake control, emergency brake assist, rollover hoops, and airbags for the driver and passenger.

The 2015 Z4 18i received three stars overall in its Euro NCAP test.

Production volumes 
Yearly production volumes for the Z4 (E89) are as follows:

Awards 
 2009 International Design Excellence Award (IDEA)
 2009 Eyes on Design Award for best production vehicle
 2009 Red Dot Design Award
 Scottish Drop Top of the Year 2009

Motorsport

BMW Z4 GT3 (2010–2015) 

The Z4 GT3 was an FIA GT3-specification model available to private teams.

In its 2010 debut season, the Z4 GT3 won the Dubai 24 Hour GT3 endurance event and finished second at the 2011 24 Hours of Spa-Francorchamps event by the Need For Speed Team Schubert. The Z4 GT3 achieved several victories in the FIA GT3 Championship and Blancpain Endurance Series.

In the 2011 Super GT season, Nobuteru Taniguchi and Taku Bamba won the GT300 class in a Z4 GT3. Tatsuya Kataoka and Nobuteru Taniguchi repeated this in 2014.

In 2013, the Z4 GT3 finished second at the 24 Hours of Nürburgring.

In 2015, the Z4 GT3 Finished first at the 2015 24 Hours of Spa.

In 2016, the Z4 GT3 was replaced by the M6 GT3.

BMW Z4 GTE (2013–2015) 

The Z4 GTE competed in the GT class of the 2013 American Le Mans Series, the GT Le Mans class of the 2014-2015 United SportsCar Championship and the 2014-2015 European Le Mans Series. It is also powered by the P65B44 V8 engine.

Turner Motorsport won the inaugural 2014 Tudor United SportsCar GT-Daytona Championship with an altered version of the Z4 GT3.

References 

Z4
Hardtop convertibles
Rear-wheel-drive vehicles
Roadsters
Cars introduced in 2009
Euro NCAP roadster sports cars